Donga Ramudu is a 1988 Telugu-language action film, produced Chalasani Gopi by under the Gopi Art Pictures banner and directed by K. Raghavendra Rao. It stars Nandamuri Balakrishna, Radha  and music composed by Chakravarthy.

Plot
The film begins in an estate owned by a millionaire Rajeswari Devi. After the death of her two sons, she sends her grandson Ramakrishna son of the elder one abroad. But unfortunately, she goes into the evil clutches of relatives. Chitrangi Devi Rajeswari Devi's daughter-in-law is the second wife of her younger son who always covets and is malice. Bhanu Prakash her heinous brother who wields on estate and slaves drives the labor. Durga granddaughter of Rajeswari Devi grows up as conceit under the uncouth of her stepmother Chitrangi. 

Moreover, Bhanoji son of Bhanu Prakash snares her in the name of love. Now it’s time for the arrival of the heir Ramakrishna which makes the fine blissful. Forthwith, the venomous begrudges and in cahoots with a nefarious Lanka Eshwar Rao. However, Ramakrishna is a stalwart who audaciously defies and desists their brutalities. Further, he embraces the workers as his own, falls for a laborer Ganga, and reforms his sister. In tandem, Ramakrishna learns Durga is pregnant which Lanka tries to exploit in his favor. During that plight, workers aid him as a backbone by which he knits Bhanoji & Durga. Hence, like gratitude, he decides to provide them with an equal share of the property. 

Thus, Lanka ploys and slaughters Ramakrishna utilizing his cousin Kaaki / Kakani Kistaiah. At once, Lanka monarchs and hogs over the estate for his malpractice. Soon, they betray and kick out Kaaki when stunningly he figures out a daredevil ruffian Donga Ramudu one that resembles Ramakrishna. Immediately, both whisks, Kaaki successfully purports him as Ramakrishna and starts vexing the miscreants. At last, as a flabbergast, it is revealed that Donga Ramudu itself Ramakrishna has escaped from the mishap. He made this play act to catch hold of convicts and correct his family members. Finally, the movie ends on a happy note with the marriage of Ramakrishna & Ganga.

Cast

Nandamuri Balakrishna as Rama Krishna
Radha as Ganga
Mohan Babu as Lanka Eswara Rao
Kanta Rao as Rama Krishna's paternal uncle
Chandra Mohan as Kakani Krishnaiah
Siva Krishna as Dharma Raju / Jaggu
Chalapathi Rao as Bhanu Prakash
P. L. Narayana as Simhadri
Balaji as Bhanoji
Vidya Sagar 
Jaya Bhaskar 
Pandari Bai as Rajyalakshmi
Malashri as Durga
Kuyili as Rani 
Y. Vijaya as Chitrangi Devi

Soundtrack 

Music composed by Chakravarthy. Lyrics were written by Jonnavithhula Ramalingeswara Rao. Music released on LEO Audio Company.

Other
 VCDs and DVDs on - VOLGA Videos, Hyderabad

References

1988 films
Films directed by K. Raghavendra Rao
Films scored by K. Chakravarthy
1980s Telugu-language films